Losing Game is an album by blues musician Lonnie Johnson, recorded in 1961 and released on the Bluesville label.

Reception

AllMusic reviewer Bill Dahl wrote that "this 1960 set is a typically gorgeous solo outing that ranges from torchy standards of the Tin Pan Alley species to bluesier pursuits of his own creation".

Track listing
All compositions by Lonnie Johnson except where noted
 "New Orleans Blues" – 2:24
 "My Little Kitten Susie" – 2:38
 "Evil Woman" – 2:30
 "What a Diff'rence a Day Makes" (María Grever, Stanley Adams) – 2:29
 "Moanin' Blues" – 3:59
 "Summertime" (George Gershwin, Ira Gershwin, DuBose Heyward) – 3:27
 "Lines in My Face" – 2:50
 "Losing Game" – 1:52
 "New Year's Blues" – 2:17
 "Slow and Easy" – 4:18
 "Four Walls and Me" – 3:45
 "You Won't Let Me Go" (Buddy Johnson) – 3:04

Personnel

Performance
Lonnie Johnson – guitar, piano, vocals

Production
Esmond Edwards – supervision
 Rudy Van Gelder – engineer

References

Lonnie Johnson (musician) albums
1961 albums
Bluesville Records albums
Albums recorded at Van Gelder Studio
Albums produced by Esmond Edwards